Ikaria Island National Airport Ikaros  is an airport on Ikaria Island, Greece.

The airport was opened on 14 June 1995 with two weekly flights from Olympic Airlines, on the DO 228 aircraft. The buildings lie in an area of 1,000 Square Meters. The airport first operated in 1995.

Airlines and destinations
The following airlines operate regular scheduled and charter flights at Ikaria Island Airport:

Statistics

See also
Transport in Greece

References

Airports in Greece
Icaria
Buildings and structures in the North Aegean